Massimo Carlotto (born 22 July 1956) is an Italian writer and playwright.

Biography

The "Carlotto case" 
Carlotto was at the center of one of the most controversial legal cases in Italian contemporary history.

In 1976, a 25-year-old student, Margherita Magello, was found dead at her home, killed by 59 stab wounds.

Massimo Carlotto, a 19-year-old student member of Lotta Continua happened upon the victim after hearing her cries. He found her bleeding and dying inside of a wardrobe. Instead of notifying the police, he panicked and fled. He was soon arrested and charged with homicide. He never wavered in maintaining his innocence.

In the first trial, he was acquitted for lack of evidence by the Criminal Court of Padua but was then sentenced upon appeal to 18 years imprisonment by the Court Call the Venice. This sentence was confirmed by the Supreme Court in 1982.
He became a fugitive, first in France and then in Mexico, where he was captured after three years on the run and extradited to Italy.
A large popular movement took up Carlotto's cause; in addition, a number of prominent figures signed a petition on his behalf including Ettore Gallo, Jorge Amado, Nilde Iotti, Norberto Bobbio, Giandomenico Pisapia, and Ferdinando Imposimato.

In 1989 the Supreme Court ordered retrial, sending the case back to the Court of Appeal of Venice to establish whether Carlotto should be acquitted in accordance with the old or the new penal code. In 1990, the question of constitutional legitimacy was raised. In 1991, the Italian Constitutional Court rendered its decision, but the President of Court's retirement meant yet another trial was necessary, during which Carlotto (suffering from a serious metabolic disease) was sentenced to 16 years in prison. This new conviction violated, Carlotto's lawyers argued, the principle of double jeopardy/ne bis in idem.

Public opinion was on Carlotto's side and in 1993 the Italian President, Oscar Luigi Scalfaro, granted him a pardon.

Writer
Massimo Carlotto began his literary career, particularly writing novels in the noir genre, with Il fuggiasco ("The Fugitive", 1995), a fictionalized autobiography about his time on the run. The book was made into a film in 2003, directed by Andrea Manni, with Daniele Liotti as Carlotto.

His most famous character is the Alligator, alias Marco Buratti, an entirely original private detective.

In 1998 he published Le irregolari, the autobiographical novel of inquiry in which is told the Argentine civil war and repression of the seventies, during the so-called dirty war. He knows and has interviewed the founder of the Abuelas de Plaza de Mayo, Estela Carlotto, whom he transpired to be related to, and who sought news of her daughter and newborn grandson, who numbered among the desaparecidos.

In 2001 he released  Arrivederci, amore ciao (which was adapted into the movie The Goodbye Kiss by Michele Soavi, 2005).

In 2004 he published L'oscura immensità della morte ("Death's Dark Abyss"), a particularly dark and nihilistic noir centered on the theme of revenge, which was adapted into the Hindi film Badlapur.

His books have been translated in France, Bulgaria, United Kingdom, Germany, Spain, Greece, Netherlands, Czech Republic and the United States.

Awards 
 Premio del Giovedì (1996) 
 Premio Dessì (1999) 
 Premio Scerbanenco (1999)
 Premio Scerbanenco (2002)
 2nd place Grand prix de littérature policière (2003) 
 Premio Ciliegia d'oro (2003) 
 Premio Lama e trama (2005)
 Finalist of Premio Bancarella (2006)
 Premio del Libraio – Città di Padova (2007)
 Finalist of Edgar Allan Poe Awards for Arrivederci amore ciao (The goodbye kiss, 2007)
 Premio Letterario Noir Ecologista Jean Claude Izzo (2009)
 Premio SUGARPRIZE (2013)

Works

Novels 
 Il fuggiasco, Roma, Edizioni e/o, 1995. .
 La verità dell'Alligatore, Roma, Edizioni e/o, 1995. .
 Il mistero di Mangiabarche, Roma, Edizioni e/o, 1997. .
 Le irregolari. Buenos Aires horror tour, Roma, Edizioni e/o, 1998. .
 Nessuna cortesia all'uscita, Roma, Edizioni e/o, 1999. .
 Arrivederci amore, ciao, Roma, Edizioni e/o, 2001. .
 L'oscura immensità della morte, Roma, Edizioni e/o, 2004. .
 Niente, più niente al mondo, Roma, Edizioni e/o, 2004. .
 with Marco Videtta, Nordest, Roma, Edizioni e/o, 2005. .
 La terra della mia anima, Roma, Edizioni e/o, 2006. .
 with Francesco Abate, Mi fido di te, Torino, Einaudi, 2007. .
 L'alligatore, Roma, Edizioni e/o (I super e/o), 2007. .
 Cristiani di Allah, Roma, Edizioni e/o, 2008. .
 con i Mama Sabot, Perdas de Fogu, Roma, Edizioni e/o, 2008. .
 con Francesco Abate, L'albero dei microchip, VerdeNero, 2009. .
 L'amore del bandito, Roma, Edizioni e/o, 2009. .
 Alla fine di un giorno noioso, Roma, Edizioni e/o, 2011. .
 Respiro corto, Einaudi, Torino, 2012
 Cocaina (con Giancarlo De Cataldo e Gianrico Carofiglio), Torino, Einaudi, 2013. 
 with Marco Videtta, Le Vendicatrici. Ksenia, Torino, Einaudi, 2013. 
 with Marco Videtta, Le Vendicatrici. Eva, Torino, Einaudi, 2013. 
 with Marco Videtta, Le Vendicatrici. Sara: Il prezzo della verità, Torino, Einaudi, 2013. 
 with Marco Videtta, Le Vendicatrici. Luz: Solo per amore, Torino, Einaudi, 2013. 
 La banda degli amanti, Roma, Edizioni e/o, 2015,

Short stories 
 Il confronto, in Tecla Dozio (a cura di), Delitti sotto l'albero. Todaro editore, 1999. .
 Champagne per due, in Tecla Dozio (a cura di), Capodanno nero. Todaro editore, 2000. .
 Il viaggio di Stefano, in Tutta un'altra vita. Roma, Minimum Fax, 2001. .
 Malavita albanese in Laura Lepri (a cura di), Albania, questa sconosciuta. In viaggio con il Premio Grinzane Cavour. Editori Riuniti, 2002.
 Carlo Marx e l'impresario, in Nel Grembo del mondo, Ed. Angolo Manzoni, 2003. .
 Sassi, bottiglie e candelotti, in Paola Staccioli (a cura di), Piazza bella piazza, allegato a L'Unità. Roma, Associazione Walter Rossi, 2005. 
 Gaia, in Laurent Lombard (a cura di), À table!. Métailié, 2004.
 San Basilio, 8 settembre 1974, in Paola Staccioli (a cura di), In ordine pubblico. Roma, Associazione Walter Rossi, 2005. 
 Morte di un confidente, in Crimini, Einaudi, 2005. .
 Il piccolo patriota padovano, in Giosuè Calaciura et al, Ricuore. Nuoro, Edizioni Il Maestrale, 2005. .
 Il traghetto in Le finestre sul cortile. Frammenti d'Italia in 49 racconti. Quiritta, 2005. .
 Sangue che va sangue che viene, in Marco Bariletti et al, Lama e trama Vol. 3. Bologna, Editrice Zona, 2006. .
 Storia di Gabriella vedova di mala, in Serge Quadruppani (a cura di), 14 colpi al cuore. Racconti inediti dei migliori giallisti italiani. Milano, Mondadori, 2002 . Collana: Il Giallo Mondadori, n. 2789.
 Cuori rossi, in (a cura di) Marco Vichi. Città in nero, 1 ed. Parma, Ugo Guanda, 2006. .
 Jasmine in Francesco Abate e Massimo Carlotto. Catfish. Reggio Emilia, Aliberti editore, 2006. .
 Nessun dubbio: omicidio-suicidio, in Mauro Zola (a cura di), Ti amo, ti ammazzo. Storie vere di amanti e assassini, Cairo Editore, 2007
 Little dream, in Giancarlo De Cataldo (a cura di) Crimini italiani. Torino, Einaudi, 2008. .
 Cortonese station, in Nero perugino. Perugia, Futura soc. coop., 2008 (edizione fuori commercio).
 A Carlo Giuliani, per il nostro domani, in Paola Staccioli (a cura di), Per sempre ragazzo. Racconti e poesie a dieci anni dall'uccisione di Carlo Giuliani, Marco Tropea editore, 2011

Essays 
 Come un rito collettivo in Almanacco Guanda a cura di Ranieri Polese. Parma, Guanda, 2005.
 Patotas in Nessuna Pietà a cura di Luca Scarlini. Adriano Salani editore, Milano 2009

Graphic novels 
 Massimo Carlotto, Giuseppe Palumbo. L'ultimo treno. Edizioni BD, 2004. .
 Massimo Carlotto, Luca Crovi & Andrea "Red" Mutti. Arrivederci amore, ciao, in Eraldo Baldini et al. Alta criminalità. Arnoldo Mondadori Editore, 2005. .
 Massimo Carlotto, Igort. Dimmi che non-vuoi morire. Milano, Mondadori, 2007. .
 Massimo Carlotto, Giuseppe Palumbo. Tomka. Il gitano di Guernica. Rizzoli, 2007. .

Literature for young people 
 Il giorno in cui Gabriel scoprì di chiamarsi Miguel Angel, 2001 .
 Jimmy della Collina, 2002 
 with Tinin Mantegazza, Il mistero dei bisonti scomparsi, 2010

English editions
The Colombian Mule, English translation by Christopher Woodall, 2001 .
The Master of Knots, English translation by Christopher Woodall, 2002 .
The Goodbye Kiss, English translation by Lawrence Venuti, 2006 .
The Fugitive, English translation by Anthony Shugaar, 2007 .
Death’s Dark Abyss, English translation by Lawrence Venuti, 2007 .
Poisonville, English translation by Lawrence Venuti, 2009 .
Bandit Love, English translation by Anthony Shugaar, 2010 .
At the End of a Dull Day, English translation by Anthony Shugaar, 2013 .
Gang of Lovers, English translation by Anthony Shugaar, 2015 .
For All the Gold in the World, English translation by Anthony Shugaar, 2016 .
Cocaine, English translation by Shaun Whiteside, 2020 .
Blues for Outlaw Hearts and Old Whores, English translation by Will Schutt, 2020 .

References

External links
  Il ritorno dell'Alligatore, Official site of Alligator series
  Official web page of Massimo Carlotto 
 Interview to The Guardian

1957 births
Living people
Italian communists
Italian mystery writers
Italian male writers
Writers from Padua
Italian people convicted of murder
Italian people imprisoned abroad
Italian journalists
Italian male journalists
Italian prisoners and detainees
Prisoners and detainees of Italy
Trials in Italy